Serena Williams's 2005 tennis season was hampered by injury and was the first time that she didn't qualify for the Year-End Championships since 1999. Williams also failed to finish in the top 10 for the first time since 1998 despite winning a slam.

Year in detail

Australian Open and early hard court season

Australian Open
Williams began her 2005 season at the Australian Open after missing the 2004 edition and winning the 2003 edition. Williams entered the event as the seventh seed. In her opening match she easily dispatch of Camille Pin, defeating the Frenchwoman with a double breadstick. She then faced Dally Randriantefy, Williams dominated her opponent dropping just three games including a bagel in the second in just 48 minutes. Williams hit 38 winners and only 18 unforced errors in the match. In the third round, Williams took on wildcard Sania Mirza, Williams closed out the first set with a breadstick and then won the second set with a single break lead in just 56 minutes. In the following match, she faced Nadia Petrova and won the first set easily with a breadstick. Petrova came back winning the second, but Williams eventually closed it out in the third set. In the final eight, she went against 2nd seed Amélie Mauresmo and dominated her injured opponent, who was hampered by an injured groin winning both sets with a drop of two games. In the semifinals, Williams took on Maria Sharapova. Sharapova dominated the first set breaking Williams twice. Sharapova then served for the match at the tenth game, but lost three straight games to lose the set. In the final set, Sharapova once again served for the match at the tenth game, however Williams saved three match points to break. Williams eventually broke for the match in the 14th game of the deciding set. In the final, Williams faced world no. 1 Lindsay Davenport, Davenport raced through the first four games in just 11 minutes. Davenport eventually won the set in the eight game. Williams then failed to convert a break point in the sixth game, but reeled in nine straight games to win the second and third sets. This is Williams seventh slam and second Australian Open. She is also riding with a 14 match winning streak at the event.

Open GDF Suez
Following her Australian Open triumph, Williams played at the Open GDF Suez. After receiving a bye in the first round, she cruised pass local Stéphanie Cohen-Aloro in straight sets before withdrawing in her scheduled quarterfinal match against Dinara Safina because of stomach flu.

Dubai Duty Free Women's Open
Williams then played at the Dubai Duty Free Women's Open and received a bye in the first round. Williams began her tournament against Elena Bovina. Williams slow start gave Bovina the chance to capture the first set with a loss of only a game. However Williams rallied to win 10 of the next 11 games to win the second set and take the first four games of the third. Bovina came back to get one of the breaks back in the sixth game just to see Williams close it out in the tenth game. Williams then faced Daniela Hantuchová in the final eight. Williams edged out Hantuchová in the first set, closing it out in the twelfth game. The second set was easier for Williams winning it in three. In the semifinals, Williams retired in her match against Jelena Janković with an arm injury after losing the first set in a bagel and down by a break in the second.

NASDAQ-100 Open
Williams came into the NASDAQ-100 Open as the three-time defending champion. Williams began her quest for her fourth consecutive title at the event against Vera Dushevina, Williams won the match with a drop of only three game including a bagel in the second. Williams then took on Shahar Pe'er and won the match with a drop of three games in both set. In the fourth round, Williams faced Elena Likhovtseva and won the first with a break lead. However, Likhovtseva evened it out by dominating the second set with a breadstick. Williams then pegged her back to win the match with a break lead in the deciding set. Williams then took on older sister Venus for a spot in the last 4. Venus took the first set with ease, winning the first set with a breadstick. In the second set, Serena had two set points to push it to a decider but Venus saved both and won the set. This loss ended Serena's 21 match winning streak in the event.

Clay court season and French Open

Bausch & Lomb Championships
Williams began her clay court campaign at the Bausch & Lomb Championships. She received a bye in the first round and then cruised through victory against Dally Randriantefy in straight sets. In the third round, she took on Mary Pierce and squeezed through the first set winning it in a tie-break. The second set was tight as well, but Williams won the set with a single break lead. In the final eight, Williams faced Italian Silvia Farina Elia. The first set, the pair went toe-to-toe with Williams winning it in the twelfth game. However, the Italian came back winning the second in a tie-break. After the conclusion of the second set, Williams retired due to a  sprained ankle.

Internazionali BNL d'Italia
Williams then played at the Internazionali BNL d'Italia and received a bye in the first round. Williams was upset in the second round by  Francesca Schiavone, Schiavone won the first set in a tie-break and then took the second set with a breadstick.

French Open
Williams then withdrew from the French Open with a sprained left ankle.

Wimbledon
Williams made her return at Wimbledon having reached the final in the previous three years. Williams began her campaign for a third Wimbledon against compatriot ranked 104 Angela Haynes. Williams led by a break but Haynes came back to force it to a tie-break, which went to a marathon with Haynes winning it in the 26th point. William broke in the third game, but Haynes broke back in the eight game. Williams won the next to games to push to a decider. The final set went on serve until Williams took the last four games beginning with the fifth. Williams then faced 124 ranked Mara Santangelo. Santangelo began the match winning the first four games and closed out the first set in the eight game. However, Williams came back winning the next two sets with ease. Williams then took on American Jill Craybas, Craybas broke in the second game, the pair then traded breaks until Craybas held in the ninth game to win the set. The second set then went to a tie-break which Craybas won, upsetting the two-time Wimbledon champion.

US Open and late hard court season

Rogers Cup
Williams then made her US Open preparation at the Rogers Cup in Toronto. Williams opened her tournament against Stéphanie Cohen-Aloro after receiving a bye in the first round. Cohen-Aloro broke in the first game but Williams won the next two to get it on serve. Cohen Aloro then took 6 of the last 7 games to win the set with a break of serve. Williams then came back winning the second set with a single break lead. In the final set, Williams broke in the first and third game and didn't look back closing it out in the eight game. Williams then withdrew prior to her match against Flavia Pennetta with a left knee pain.

US Open
Williams then competed at the US Open. She began her campaign against Taiwan's Chan Yung-jan. Williams took the first set with a breadstick and then won the last four games of the second set from the sixth game. Williams then faced Catalina Castaño and dropped only four games with a straight sets victory dropping two games in each set. In the third round, Williams faced Francesca Schiavone and once again won easily winning both set with a single break lead. In the Round of 16, it was a Williams battle, as she took on sister Venus. The first set the sisters went toe-to-toe pushing it to a tie-break, which Venus won. Venus then carried the momentum winning the second set with ease to end her younger sisters US Open campaign.

China Open
Williams played her final tournament of 2005 at the China Open but was upset by local 127th ranked Sun Tiantian. Sun won the first set with ease but was pushed by her higher ranked opponent into a tie-break, which the Chinese won.

All matches

Singles matches

Tournament schedule

Singles schedule
Williams' 2005 singles tournament schedule is as follows:

Yearly records

Head–to–head matchups
Ordered by percentage of wins

 Dally Randriantefy 2–0
 Stéphanie Cohen-Aloro 2–0
 Camille Pin 1–0
 Nadia Petrova 1–0
 Sania Mirza 1–0
 Amélie Mauresmo 1–0
 Mara Santangelo 1–0
 Elena Likhovtseva 1–0
 Chan Yung-jan 1–0
 Maria Sharapova 1–0
 Lindsay Davenport 1–0
 Daniela Hantuchová 1–0
 Vera Dushevina 1–0
 Shahar Pe'er 1–0
 Elena Bovina 1–0
 Mary Pierce 1–0
 Angela Haynes 1–0
 Catalina Castaño 1–0
 Francesca Schiavone 1–1
 Silvia Farina Elia 0–1
 Jill Craybas 0–1
 Sun Tiantian 0–1
 Jelena Janković 0–1
 Venus Williams 0–2

Finals

Singles: 1 (1–0)

Earnings

 Figures in United States dollars (USD) unless noted.

See also
2005 Maria Sharapova tennis season
2005 WTA Tour

References

External links

Serena Williams tennis seasons
Williams, Serena
2005 in American tennis